Vlado Mrkić (born 16 March 1940) is a Bosnian-Herzegovinian writer and journalist. He was born in Mostar in 1940 and graduated from the Philosophy College in Sarajevo. He has worked as a journalist since 1968 and has received a number of journalism awards - most of which he has refused to accept. During the Bosnian war he worked as a war reporter and visited most of former Yugoslavian war fronts.

He is author of three books: "Together Never Again" (original: Nikad Više Zajedno), "Berenika's Hair" (original: Berenikina Kosa) and "East From the West" (original: Istočno od Zapada).

References

Living people
Journalists from Sarajevo
Writers from Mostar
1940 births
Bosnia and Herzegovina writers
Bosnia and Herzegovina journalists